Easter Monday is the second day of Easter and a public holiday in some countries. In Western Christianity it marks the second day of the Octave of Easter; in Eastern Christianity it marks the second day of Bright Week.

Religious observances

Eastern Christianity

In the Eastern Orthodox Church and Byzantine Rite Catholic Churches, this day is called "Bright Monday" or "Renewal Monday". The services, as in the rest of Bright Week, are quite different from during the rest of the year and are similar to the services on Pascha (Easter Sunday) and include an outdoor procession after the Divine Liturgy; while this is prescribed for all days of that week, often they are only celebrated on Monday and maybe a couple of other days in parish churches, especially in non-Orthodox countries. Also, when the calendar date of the feast day of a major saint, e.g., St. George or the patron saint of a church or one's name day, falls during Holy Week or on Easter Sunday, the saint's day is celebrated on Easter Monday.

National observances

Australia
In Australia, Easter Monday is a public holiday. Some people enjoy outdoor sporting events, such as the Oakbank Easter Racing Carnival in South Australia, and the Stawell Gift in Victoria, as well as a traditional AFL match between Geelong Cats and the Hawthorn Hawks at the MCG. Since 2014, The NRL have held the Easter Monday match (NRL) between the Parramatta Eels and Wests Tigers match at Stadium Australia. Australian Three Peaks Race in Tasmania until 2011.

Austria

In Austria and Southern Germany, there is the traditional "Emmausgang", commemorating the walk of the disciples to Emmaus, to which Jesus followed them without being recognized.

Canada
Easter Monday is the Monday immediately following Easter Sunday and is a statutory holiday for federal employees. Although not mandatory by federal regulation, some employers also give this day off to employees out of common practice. Additionally, this holiday succeeds Good Friday (the Friday preceding Easter), which is a mandatory holiday for all employees, giving those workers an extra long weekend in March or April. An exception to this rule is in Quebec, where employers must give either Good Friday or Easter Monday off to employees. In provinces where Family Day, Islander Day, or Louis Riel Day are not observed, Easter Weekend is the first provincial holiday after New Year's Day.

Central Europe

Śmigus-dyngus (or lany poniedziałek, Polish for Wet Monday) is the name for Easter Monday in Poland and the diaspora. In the Czech Republic it is called velikonoční pondělí, in Slovakia veľkonočný pondelok and in Hungary Vízbevető. All these Catholic countries (and some others) practice the unique ancient custom on this day. Traditionally, boys and men pour a bucket of water or perfume on girls and women and/or spank their buttocks and legs with long thin twigs (pussy willow) or switches made from willow, birch or decorated tree branches. A legend says that it keep women healthy, beautiful, and fertile during the whole next year.

Another related custom, unique to Poland, is that of sprinkling bowls (garce) of ashes on people or houses, celebrated a few weeks earlier at the "półpoście". This custom is almost forgotten, but still practiced in the area around the borders of Masuria and Masovia.

Egypt

In Egypt, the ancient festival of Sham Ennessim (literally meaning "smelling of the breeze") is celebrated on the Coptic (i.e. Eastern) Easter Monday, though the festival dates back to Pharonic times (about 2700 BC). It is an Egyptian national holiday. Traditional activities include painting eggs, taking meals outdoors, and eating feseekh (fermented mullet).

Germany
In Germany, people go out into the fields early in the morning and hold Easter egg races. For Roman Catholics, Easter Monday is also a Holy Day of Obligation in Germany.

Ireland
In the Republic of Ireland it is a day of remembrance for the men and women who died in the Easter Rising which began on Easter Monday 1916. Until 1966, there was a parade of veterans, past the headquarters of the Irish Republican Army at the General Post Office (GPO) on O'Connell Street, and a reading of the Proclamation of the Irish Republic.

Italy
In Italy, Easter Monday is an official public holiday and is called “Pasquetta”.  It is customary to prepare a family picnic in the countryside or barbecues with friends.

New Zealand
In New Zealand it is a National Public Holiday. Schools often extend the weekend to the Tuesday to give students a 5-day break.

Spain

In Spain, the Easter Monday is an official public holiday in the autonomous communities of Catalonia, the Land of Valencia, Balearic Islands, Navarre, the Basque Autonomous Community, Cantabria, Castilla–La Mancha and La Rioja. In Catalonia, the Land of Valencia and Murcia is typical a kind of cake called Easter mona. It's usually given by godparents to their godchild  and it is a tradition for families or groups of friends to gather together and to go somewhere, specially to the countryside, to eat the mona.

Netherlands
In the Netherlands Easter Monday is an official public holiday. Apart from church services in some locations in the Dutch "bible belt", there are no widespread festivities or traditions for the "Second Easter Day" ("Tweede Paasdag").

United States

In the United States, Easter Monday is not a federal holiday, and is generally not observed on a nationwide level, apart from a few traditions such as the White House Easter egg roll. On a local level, the day is informally observed in some areas such as the state of North Dakota, and some cities in New York, Michigan, and Indiana. Easter Monday was a public holiday in North Carolina from 1935 to 1987, due to the early-20th-century tradition of state government workers taking the day off to attend the annual baseball game between North Carolina State College and Wake Forest College. Texas and Maryland schools often have two holidays on Good Friday and Easter Monday. In some states and districts, public schools and universities are closed on Easter Monday, often part of spring break.

Dyngus Day

Traditionally Polish areas of the United States observe Easter Monday as Dyngus Day. Dyngus Day celebrations are widespread and popular in Chicago; Cleveland; Buffalo, New York; Wyandotte and Hamtramck in Michigan; South Bend and La Porte in Indiana; and Hanover, New Hampshire.

United Kingdom
Three of the four countries of the United Kingdom have Easter Monday as a bank holiday: England, Wales, and Northern Ireland. In Leicestershire, England, the people of Hallaton hold a bottle-kicking match and Hare Pie Scramble.

South Africa
In South Africa, Easter Monday is the last day of the holy weekend. It is known as Family Day and is a public holiday. After this day, people return to work and children to school, so it is a day of rest.

Ukraine
In Ukraine, Easter Monday is celebrated. It is a public holiday. After this day, people return to work and children to school, so it is a day of rest.

See also

References

External links

Everything you should know about Dingus day
2006 NPR Story on Dingus Day (audio file)
Poland's Dingus Day, and other Easter Monday customs By Pip Wilson
Dyngus Day Buffalo

Eastertide
Monday observances
Polish traditions
Catholic liturgy
Byzantine Rite
Greek traditions
Public holidays in Greece
Eastern Orthodox liturgical days
March observances
April observances
May observances
Public holidays in Armenia
Public holidays in Australia
Public holidays in Austria
Public holidays in the Bahamas
Public holidays in Barbados
Public holidays in Belgium
Public holidays in Botswana
Public holidays in Croatia
Public holidays in the Czech Republic
Public holidays in Denmark
Holidays in England
Public holidays in Fiji
Public holidays in France
Public holidays in Germany
Public holidays in Ghana
Public holidays in Grenada
Public holidays in Hungary
Public holidays in Iceland
Public holidays in Italy
Public holidays in the Republic of Ireland
Public holidays in Jamaica
Public holidays in Kenya
Public holidays in Latvia
Public holidays in Liechtenstein
Public holidays in Lithuania
Public holidays in Luxembourg
Public holidays in Monaco
Public holidays in the Netherlands
Public holidays in New Zealand
Public holidays in Nigeria
Public holidays in Norway
Public holidays in Poland
Public holidays in Rwanda
Public holidays in Slovakia
Public holidays in South Africa
Public holidays in Sweden
Public holidays in Switzerland
Public holidays in Tanzania
Public holidays in Trinidad and Tobago
Holidays in Wales
Public holidays in Zambia
Public holidays in Zimbabwe